Ken Webster may refer to:

 Ken Webster (American football) (born 1996), American football cornerback
 Ken Webster (director) (born 1957), American actor and director
 Ken Webster (hypnotist) (born 1964), British hypnotist